Rajendrapur Cantonment is a cantonment located in Rajendrapur, Gazipur, Dhaka Division, Bangladesh.

It is one of the best school in Gazipur

History
The illicit weapons in the Purulia arms drop case had stated Rajendrapur in their end user certificate.

Institutions
Combined Military Hospital
Ordnance Centre and School
Read in Bengali
Central Ammunition Depot
Bangladesh Institute of peace support operations training (BIPSOT)
Ministry Of Defence Constabulary(MODC)
902 central workshop EME
Station Headquarters, Rajendrapur Cantonment

References

Cantonments of Bangladesh